Secondo "Conte" Candoli (July 12, 1927 – December 14, 2001) was an American jazz trumpeter based on the West Coast. He played in the big bands of Woody Herman, Stan Kenton, Benny Goodman, and Dizzy Gillespie, and in Doc Severinsen's NBC Orchestra on The Tonight Show Starring Johnny Carson. He played with Gerry Mulligan, and on Frank Sinatra's TV specials. He also recorded with Supersax, a Charlie Parker tribute band that consisted of a saxophone quintet, the rhythm section, and either a trumpet or trombone.

Music career
Conte was the younger brother of trumpeter Pete Candoli. He was born in Mishawaka, Indiana, United States. During the summer of 1943, while at Mishawaka High School, Secondo "Conte" Candoli sat in with Woody Herman's First Herd. After graduating in 1945, he joined the band full-time, where he sat side by side with his brother Pete in the trumpet section. Conte immediately went on the road, where he stayed for the next ten years, with Herman, Stan Kenton, Benny Goodman, and Dizzy Gillespie.

In 1954, after leaving Stan Kenton, Candoli formed his own group with sidemen Chubby Jackson, Frank Rosolino, and Lou Levy. He soon moved to Los Angeles to join the Lighthouse All-Stars with Shorty Rogers, Bud Shank, and Bob Cooper, and was with them for four years.

Candoli's long relationship with The Tonight Show began in 1967 and he became a permanent fixture in the orchestra's trumpet section, when Johnny Carson moved the show to Burbank, California in 1972. For many years he preferred to stay in California where he could do The Tonight Show, take all the studio work he wanted, and do occasional concerts and clinics. He ventured to Kansas in 1986 as a WJF All-Star with Jerome Richardson, Barney Kessel and Monty Alexander at the 1986 Wichita Jazz Festival. After Carson's retirement in 1992, he traveled occasionally with Doc Severinsen, but still enjoyed his solo playing.

His playing brought him performing and recording opportunities with top names in show business, such as Gerry Mulligan, Shelly Manne, Terry Gibbs, Teddy Edwards, Bing Crosby, Sammy Davis Jr., and Sarah Vaughan. He has appeared in many motion pictures with various orchestras and worked in all of Frank Sinatra's TV specials.

Candoli was inducted into The International Jazz Hall of Fame in 1997. He died of prostate cancer at the age of 74, in Palm Desert, California.

Band memberships

{| class="wikitable"
|-
! Band
! Years
|-
| Woody Herman's First Herd
| 1943 Summer 1945–
|-
| Chubby Jackson's Fifth Dimensional Jazz Group
|
|-
| Stan Kenton
| 1948
|-
| Charlie Ventura's "Bop for the People"
| 1949
|-
| Stan Kenton
| 1951–1954
|-
| Terry Gibbs Dream Band
| –
|-
| Gerry Mulligan's Concert Jazz Band
| 1960–1961
|-
| Howard Rumsey's Lighthouse All-Stars
| 1956–1960
|-
| Supersax
|
|-
| The Tonight Show
| 1967–1972 Guest 1972–1992 Regular
|-
| Candoli Brothers
| 1957–1962
|-
|}

Discography

{| class="wikitable"
|-
!Album
!Release
|-
| Sincerely, Conte Candoli
| 1954
|-
| Groovin' High: Conte Candoli, Vol. 2
| 1955
|-
| Toots Sweet and West Coast Wailers
| 1955
|-
| Groovin' Higher: Conte Candoli Quintet
| 1955
|-
| Conte Candoli Quartet
| 1957
|-
| Mucho Calor
| 1957
|-
| Little Band Big Jazz
| 1960
|-
| Conversation
| 1973
|-
| Candoli Brothers
| 1970s
|-
| Old Acquaintance
| 1985
|-
| Sweet Simon
| 1992
|-
| Meets the Joe Haider Trio
| 1994
|-
| Portrait of a Count
| 1966
|-
| Candoli Live
| 2002
|-
| The Complete Phoenix Recordings, Vol. 1
| 2002
|-
| Fine and Dandy
|
|-
|}

As sideman
With Manny Albam and Ernie Wilkins
 The Drum Suite (RCA Victor, 1956)
With Chet Baker
 Chet Baker Big Band (Pacific Jazz, 1956)
With Louis Bellson
 Big Band Jazz from the Summit (Roulette, 1962)
With Elmer Bernstein
 The Man with the Golden Arm (Decca, 1956)
With Buddy Bregman
Swinging Kicks (Verve, 1957)
With Bob Cooper
 Coop! The Music of Bob Cooper (Contemporary, 1958)
With Sonny Criss
 Sonny's Dream (Prestige, 1968)
With Teddy Edwards
 Feelin's (Muse, 1974)
with Victor Feldman
Latinsville! (Contemporary, 1960)
With Maynard Ferguson
 Dimensions (EmArcy, 1955)
 Maynard Ferguson Octet (EmArcy, 1955)
With Clare Fischer
 Manteca! (Pacific Jazz, 1965)
 Thesaurus (Atlantic, 1969)
With Gil Fuller
 Night Flight (Pacific Jazz, 1965)
With Stan Getz
 West Coast Jazz (Norgran, 1955)
With Stan Levey
 This Time The Drum's On Me (Bethlehem, 1955)
With Dizzy Gillespie
 The New Continent (Limelight, 1962)
With Stan Kenton
 Popular Favorites by Stan Kenton (Capitol, 1953)
 Sketches on Standards (Capitol, 1953)
 This Modern World (Capitol, 1953)
 Portraits on Standards (Capitol, 1953)
 The Kenton Era (Capitol, 1940–54, [1955])
 Kenton / Wagner (Capitol, 1964)
 The Innovations Orchestra (Capitol, 1950–51 [1997])
With Shelly Manne
 Shelly Manne & His Men Play Peter Gunn (Contemporary, 1959)
 Ruth Price with Shelly Manne & His Men at the Manne-Hole (Contemporary, 1961) with Ruth Price
 Live! Shelly Manne & His Men at the Manne-Hole (Contemporary, 1961)
 Shelly Manne & His Men Play Checkmate (Contemporary, 1961)
 My Fair Lady with the Un-original Cast (Capitol, 1964)
 Manne–That's Gershwin! (Capitol, 1965)
 Boss Sounds! (Atlantic, 1966)
 Jazz Gunn (Atlantic, 1967)
 Perk Up (Concord Jazz, 1967 [1976])
With Jack Montrose
 Jack Montrose Sextet (Pacific Jazz, 1955)
With Frank Morgan
Frank Morgan (Gene Norman Presents, 1955)
With Gerry Mulligan
 The Concert Jazz Band (Verve, 1960)
 Gerry Mulligan and the Concert Jazz Band on Tour (Verve, 1960 [1962])
With Joe Newman
 Salute to Satch (RCA Victor, 1956)
With Jack Nitzsche
Heart Beat (Soundtrack) (Capitol, 1980)
With Anita O'Day
Cool Heat (Verve, 1959)
With Art Pepper
Gettin' Together (Contemporary 1958) 
With Betty Roché
 Take the "A" Train (Bethlehem, 1956)

With Shorty Rogers
 Martians Come Back! (Atlantic, 1955 [1956])
 Way Up There (Atlantic, 1955 [1957])
 Shorty Rogers Plays Richard Rodgers (RCA Victor, 1957)
 Portrait of Shorty (RCA Victor, 1957)
 Chances Are It Swings (RCA Victor, 1958)
The Swingin' Nutcracker (RCA Victor, 1960) 
An Invisible Orchard (RCA Victor, 1961 [1997])
With Pete Rugolo
Ten Trumpets and 2 Guitars (Mercury, 1961)
With Bud Shank
 Windmills of Your Mind (Pacific Jazz, 1969)
With Lalo Schifrin
 Jazz Suite on the Mass Texts (RCA Victor, 1965) with Paul Horn
 More Mission: Impossible (Paramount, 1968)
 Mannix (Paramount, 1968)
With Gerald Wilson
 The Golden Sword (Pacific Jazz, 1966)
With Pete Candoli
The Candoli Brothers (Dobre Records DR1050, 1978)

References

External links

Conte Candoli Collection, part of the International Jazz Collections at the University of Idaho Library

1927 births
2001 deaths
American jazz musicians
American jazz trumpeters
American male trumpeters
Cool jazz trumpeters
West Coast jazz trumpeters
Bebop trumpeters
Hard bop trumpeters
Jazz musicians from California
Musicians from Indiana
Musicians from Los Angeles
People from Mishawaka, Indiana
Deaths from prostate cancer
Blue Note Records artists
20th-century American musicians
20th-century trumpeters
American male jazz musicians
Crown Records artists
The Capp-Pierce Juggernaut members
The Tonight Show Band members
20th-century American male musicians
Deaths from cancer in California
Nagel-Heyer Records artists